Carving an Icon is the debut album by the Norwegian extreme / gothic metal band Viper Solfa. The album was released on February 20, 2015 under the German record label Massacre Records.

History 
Almost a year after Viper Solfa have settled in Kristiansand, Norway, the band signed a contract with Massacre Records in 2014, after composing and rehearsing several songs.

The recording sessions took place between May and July 2014 in Transient Lab (mostly), the Strand Studio in Oslo, Norway and several vocal tracks were recorded in the Spacemachine Studio. The recording and mixing were completed in Sound Suite Studio in Marseille, France with producer Terje Refsnes, who previously worked with groups of similar genres such as Trail of Tears,  Tristania, Sirenia and Carpathian Forest among many. Carving an Icon  was finally released on 20 February 2015.

Former Tristania singer Vibeke Stene is one of the main songwriters for the song called Whispers and Storms.

The cover art was created by renowned Brazilian graphic designer Marcelo Vasco, creator of the covers of bands such as Machine Head, Dimmu Borgir and Borknagar.

Track listing

Personnel

Viper Solfa 
Ronny Thorsen - Male vocals (growling)
Miriam Elisabeth Renvåg "Sphinx" - Female vocals
Krister Dreyer "Morfeus" - Guitars, keyboards, orchestrations
Endre Moe "Mr. Moe" - Bass guitar
Bjørn Dugstad Rønnow - Drums

Production and engineering 
Terje Refsnes - producer, engineer
Marius Strand - mixing, mastering
Marcelo Vasco - cover art, design

References

External links 
 Carving an Icon en Allmusic
Carving an Icon on Metallum Archives
Metal Nation - album review

2015 debut albums
Massacre Records albums
Viper Solfa albums